Diouf, (French spelling in Senegal) or "Joof" (English spelling in The Gambia) is a Serer surname carried by several personalities  :

People

 Abdou Diouf (born 1935), second president of Senegal, former Secretary-General of La Francophonie
 El Hadji Diouf (born 1981), Senegalese footballer
 Élage Diouf, Senegalese singer, songwriter and percussionist living in Quebec
 Ibra Diouf, member of the Pan-African Parliament
 Jacques Diouf, Senegalese politician (Director-General Food and Agriculture Organization of the United Nations FAO)
 Mamadou Diouf (historian), Senegalese historian, professor at Columbia University
 Mame Biram Diouf (born 1987), Senegalese footballer who plays for Stoke City.
 Mame Tacko Diouf (born 1976), Senegalese hurdler
 Mouss Diouf (born 1964), French actor
 Ngalandou Diouf, Senegalese politician (1875-1941), first African elected official since the beginning of colonization
 Ndella Paye Diouf (born c. 1974), Senegal-born French Afro-feminist
 Pape Diouf, (1951–2020) President of Olympiques de Marseille
 Pape Paté Diouf (born 1986), Senegalese footballer
 Sylviane Diouf, historian and writer
 Valentina Diouf, Italian women's volleyball player of Senegalese descendant.
 Yehvann Diouf, French Footballer

Serer surnames